William Wilkinson (1 September 1899 – 5 May 1974) was an Australian cricketer. He played ten first-class cricket matches for Victoria between 1924 and 1931.

See also
 List of Victoria first-class cricketers

References

External links
 

1899 births
1974 deaths
Australian cricketers
Victoria cricketers
Cricketers from Melbourne